One Island Lake Provincial Park is a provincial park in British Columbia, Canada.

History
The park was established 1963.

Conservation
Established between the Kiskatinaw River and the West Kiskatinaw River, the park provides representation of the Kiskatinaw Plateau ecosection. Moose, white-tail and mule deer, beaver and black bear are also common to the area. The lake is stocked annually with brook and rainbow trout. The park was created mainly for recreational purposes.

Recreation
The following recreational activities are available: vehicle accessible camping, picnicking, swimming, canoeing and kayaking, boating, SCUBA diving and snorkeling, windsurfing, and waterskiing.

Location
One Island Lake is located 60 kilometres southeast of, and provides drinking water to, Dawson Creek, British Columbia.

Size
59 hectares in size.

See also
List of British Columbia Provincial Parks
List of Canadian provincial parks

External links
One Island Lake Provincial Park
 Discover the Peace Country - One Island Lake

Peace River Regional District
Provincial parks of British Columbia
1963 establishments in British Columbia
Protected areas established in 1963